The Samuel Black Range is a mountain range in the angle of the upper Toodoggone and the Finlay Rivers in northern British Columbia, Canada. It has an area of 808 km2 and is a subrange of the Omineca Mountains which in turn form part of the Interior Mountains.  The range is named for Samuel Black, the first European to explore the area.

References

Omineca Mountains